Bowling at the 2007 Asian Indoor Games was held in Bowling Centre, Macau, China from 27 October to 2 November 2007.

Medalists

Men

Women

Medal table

Results

Men

Singles
27 October

Preliminary

Knockout round

Doubles
29 October

Preliminary

Knockout round

Team of 4

Preliminary
31 October – 1 November

Knockout round
2 November

Women

Singles
28 October

Preliminary

Knockout round

Doubles
30 October

Preliminary

Knockout round

Team of 4

Preliminary
31 October – 1 November

Knockout round
2 November

References
 2007 Asian Indoor Games official website
 bowlingdigital.com
 www.abf-online.org

2007
2007 Asian Indoor Games events
Asian Indoor Games